The Great South Bay Bridge  is a bridge on the southwest side of Suffolk County, New York, on Long Island. It connects the Robert Moses Causeway from Long Island's mainland over the Great South Bay, connecting to Captree and Jones Beach islands. It serves as access via the Robert Moses Causeway to both of the downstream crossings, the State Boat Channel Bridge and the Fire Island Inlet Bridge, also leading visitors and on-lookers to either the Fire Island Lighthouse or the Robert Moses State Park.

History
The bridge was originally a single span, that opened in 1954 and was called the Captree Bridge. Today it carries southbound traffic.

In 1964, a second parallel span opened to traffic and carried northbound traffic. This brought much needed relief to traffic heading back from Jones Beach, Robert Moses, and Captree parks. The bridges are through trusses and are painted a traditional "bridge green".

In 1997, a major rebuild of the deck of the older span began and was completed in 2000. Safety compliant railings were installed on the older span. In 2013–2014, the northbound span received upgraded railings. Major improvements NYSDOT is considering is a cycle/pedestrian path shared with the northbound lanes. NYSDOT has not released any official plans.

See also 

 State Boat Channel Bridge

References

External links
Great South Bay Bridge (Weather Underground.com)
Great South Bay Bridge (Historic Bridges of the United States)
Robert Moses Causeway @ NYCRoads.com

Bridges on Long Island
Road bridges in New York (state)
Truss bridges in the United States
Metal bridges in the United States
Bridges in Suffolk County, New York